Planète Némo is a German television series.

See also
List of German television series

1998 German television series debuts
French-language education television programming
Das Erste original programming